Onat Kazaklı (born 9 May 1993) is a Turkish rower competing in the single sculls event. He obtained a quota for the 2020 Summer Olympics.

He competed at the 2010 Summer Youth Olympics, and the 2019 World Rowing Championships.

References

1993 births
Living people
Sportspeople from Istanbul
Turkish male rowers
Fenerbahçe Rowing rowers
Rowers at the 2010 Summer Youth Olympics
Rowers at the 2020 Summer Olympics
Olympic rowers of Turkey